This is a channel list on the Northern Marianas Islands.

List
 (no channel)
 Flame Tree TV
 Saipan Visitor's Channel
 NHK Japanese
 CNN International
 Docomo Weather Channel
 ABC7 (KTGM - Guam)
 NBC (KUAM-TV - Guam)
 CTI (Chung T'ien Television)
 Fox (Guam)
 CBS (KITV - Guam)
 PBS (KGTF - Guam)
 USA Network
 (no channel)
 HBO (Home Box Office)
 Cinemax
 Starz!
 Showtime
 TMC (The Movie Channel)
 Kapatid TV5
 GMA (Pinoy TV)
 TFC (The Filipino Channel)
 Saipan Government Channel
 KBS World
 ESPN (The Sports Channel)
 ESPN2 (The Sports Channel 2)
 The Golf Channel
 Paramount
 Nickelodeon
 Disney Junior
 Cartoon Network
 Lifetime
 TLC (The Learning Channel)
 Hallmark Channel
 Hallmark Movie Channel (Hallmark Movies)
 Freeform
 TV Land
 HGTV (Home & Garden Television)
 Food Network
 EWTN (Eternal World Television Network)
 Island Information Local Classifieds
 Docomo Sports Channel
 CNBC Asia
 Fox News Channel (FXN)
 Animal Planet
 Discovery Channel
 History Channel
 A&E (Arts & Entertainment)
 National Geographic Channel (NatGeo)
 Syfy Channel (Sci-Fi Channel)
 FX (Fox Extended)
 Fox Movie Channel (FXM)
 Turner Classic Movies (TCM)
 AMC (American Movie Classic)
 ION Television
 TNT (Turner Network Television)
 Comedy Central
 MTV (Music Television)
 VH1 (Video Hits Number One)
 CNMI Channel Line-up

References

Northern Mariana Islands
Television in the Northern Mariana Islands
Television channels